The Louisa Commercial Historic District, in Louisa, Kentucky, is a  historic district which was listed on the National Register of Historic Places in 1988.  The listing included six contributing buildings.

It includes:
Snyder Brothers Hardware (c.1885), 309-313 E. Main St., a two-story brick building
Gunnell's Department Store (1892), 217 E. Main St.
Service Chevrolet Co., NE corner of E. Main St. and Main Cross St.
Woods Building (1921), 110-114 Main Cross St., a two-story brick building
Recorder Building (1925), 116 Main Cross St., originally home of a Republican newspaper
F. Snyder Building (1927), 118-122 Main Cross St.

References

National Register of Historic Places in Lawrence County, Kentucky
Victorian architecture in Kentucky
Queen Anne architecture in Kentucky
Commercial buildings on the National Register of Historic Places in Kentucky
Louisa, Kentucky